The 1521–22 papal conclave elected Pope Adrian VI to succeed Pope Leo X. The conclave was marked by the early candidacies of cardinal-nephew Giulio de'Medici (future Pope Clement VII) and Alessandro Farnese (future Pope Paul III), although the Colonna and other cardinals blocked their election.

Adrian, the viceroy to Spain and a clear pro-Imperial candidate, was elected as a compromise candidate despite his absence from the conclave. The number of cardinal-electors (thirty-nine) and the length of the sede vacante increased the cost of the conclave even in excess of the funds distributed by Charles V, Holy Roman Emperor, Francis I of France, and Henry VIII of England to promote their candidates.

Cardinal electors
There were thirty-nine cardinal electors, only three of whom were non-Italians (two Spaniards and one Swiss). Nine non-Italians did not attend (compared to only one Italian), despite the lengthy delay. The lengthy delay was due to the capture of one cardinal on his way to Rome, who was held for ransom. In the meantime, the agents of Charles V, Holy Roman Emperor, Francis I of France, and Henry VIII of England began to distribute the large sums that the monarchs had sent to Rome for bribes.

The preferred choice of Henry VIII was Thomas Wolsey (for whom he was prepared to spend 100,000 ducats), although Giulio de'Medici (future Pope Clement VII) was also acceptable to him. Henry VIII asked Charles V (with whom he was allied) to support Wolsey and send his army to Rome. Even the large bribes of these monarchs were less than the cost of the conclave, and even the papal tiara was mortgaged to continue to fund it, and only a very few of the Italian cardinals would even consider a non-Italian.

Charles V eventually threw his support behind Medici rather than Wolsey, although he was opposed by many because he was the cousin of Leo X and the College feared a hereditary papacy.

Francis I supported the election of a French pope, backed by one million gold ecus, although whether he actually sent the funds to Rome is unclear; in fact, Francis I's agents focused their attention on the pro-French Italian candidates, mainly the three Venetians. Francis I claimed to control the votes of twelve cardinals.

Medici for his part entered the conclave with fifteen or sixteen supporters, but very little chance of securing additional votes.

The papabile

The bookmakers of Rome offered bets on the papabile, an early example of gambling on papal elections; Medici had the best odds at 25 to 100; Farnese's odds were 20 to 100.

Proceedings
The conclave began on December 28, twenty-seven days after the death of Leo X. The cardinals agreed to a conclave capitulation, but Baumgartner calls it "an exercise in futility as always". The balloting began on December 30.

Farnese, supported by Medici and his supporters, received twelve initial votes, all from creations of Leo X. If Farnese could have secured the votes of Leo X's other cardinals (twenty-eight of the thirty-nine electors), he could easily have been elected. The Roman mob looted his home (as was customary for newly elected popes) and his odds increased to 40 to 100, although his votes dropped to four on the second day. After the second ballot, one cardinal pleading ill health was released from the conclave by a two-thirds vote.

The conclave dragged well into 1522, taking only one vote per day; various Italian ambassadors remained well-informed of the progress throughout. Farnese remained the favorite into the eighth scrutiny, with Medici asking for an accessus after Farnese received twelve votes. Farnese received eight or nine additional votes by accessus, and one cardinal even shouted out "Papam Habemus!". However, two of Farnese's strongest opponents demanded a formal counting of the votes, and it was revealed that Farnese was just short of the required supermajority, after which Farnese was discredited and lost support.

Medici attempted to promote the candidacy of others in his party, but none could gain wide support. Wolsey received eight votes, but his young age deterred other cardinals from supporting him (the English ambassador tried to convince the College he was over fifty). Medici addressed the conclave on January 9 and suggested they turn their attention to candidates not present in the conclave, expressing his willingness to elect Adrian of Utrecht. In the following scrutiny Adrian received fifteen votes, including all those controlled by Medici. Colonna, the main opponent of Medici and those in his party then declared his support for Adrian, netting him thirteen more votes by accessus, exactly two-thirds. As Adrian was not present, his candidacy did not require two-thirds plus one.

The crowd did not understand which cardinal had been elected immediately upon announcement, as Adrian was relatively obscure and currently in Spain as viceroy to Charles V. Three cardinals were dispatched to inform him of his election, with a private letter reaching him on January 24 (the cardinals would not arrive until March). In the meantime, rumors of Adrian VI's death spread in Rome and Francis I began to prepare for a new conclave. When news of his election as Bishop of Rome first reached him, he hesitated, but out of a sense of duty, he ended up accepting.

The cardinals did not bring a fisherman's ring with them to Spain, to ensure that Adrian VI would be forced to travel to Rome, where he arrived on August 28. Adrian VI said mass every day for the year he was pope, in contrast to his two predecessors who may have never celebrated mass at all.

Notes

References

 J. P. Adams, Sede Vacante and Conclave of 1521-1522.  Retrieved: 03/10/2016

 Ludwig Pastor, History of the Popes (tr. R.F. Kerr) Volume VIII (St. Louis 1908) pp. 31–41.
 Ferdinand Gregorovius, The History of Rome in the Middle Ages (translated from the fourth German edition by A. Hamilton) Volume 8 part 2 [Book XIV, Chapter 4-5] (London 1902), pp. 415–430.
 Constantin von Hoster, Papst Adrian VI 1522-1523 (Wien 1880), pp. 66–95. 
 F. Petruccelli della Gattina, Histoire diplomatique des conclaves Volume I (Paris: 1864), pp. 512–526.

1521 in the Papal States
1522 in the Papal States
1521
16th-century elections
1521 in politics
1522 in politics
16th-century Catholicism
1521 in Europe
1522 in Europe